Don Overton (September 24, 1967) is a former professional American football player who played running back in the National Football League (NFL) for three seasons for the New England Patriots and Detroit Lions.

References

1967 births
American football running backs
New England Patriots players
Detroit Lions players
Fairmont State Fighting Falcons football players
Living people